Deep Cuts is the tenth studio album by English band Strawbs.

Track listing
Side one
"I Only Want My Love to Grow in You" (Dave Cousins, Chas Cronk) – 3:00
"Turn Me Round" (Cousins, Cronk) – 3:42
"Hard Hard Winter" (Cousins, Robert Kirby) – 2:54
"My Friend Peter" (Cousins, Cronk) – 2:15
"The Soldier's Tale" (Cousins, Cronk) – 4:15

Side two
"Simple Visions" (Cousins, Cronk) – 4:40
"Charmer" (Cousins, Cronk) – 3:13
"Wasting my Time (Thinking of You)" (Cousins, Cronk) – 2:27
"Beside the Rio Grande" (Cousins) – 4:18
"So Close and Yet So Far Away" (Cousins) – 2:59

Bonus track - Japanese re-issue CD 
"You Won't See the Light" (Dave Lambert)

Personnel
Dave Cousins – lead vocals, backing vocals, acoustic guitar
Dave Lambert – lead vocals, backing vocals, acoustic guitar, electric guitar
Chas Cronk – backing vocals, bass guitar, acoustic guitar
Rod Coombes – backing vocals, drums, percussion

Additional personnel
Robert Kirby – backing vocals, mellotron, electric piano, French horn
John Mealing – piano, organ, electric piano, harpsichord, synthesizer
Rupert Holmes – piano, harpsichord, clavinet, clarinet

Recording

Rupert Holmes, Jeffrey Lesser – Producers
Jeffrey Lesser – Engineer

Recorded and mixed at The Manor, Kidlington, Oxfordshire

Release history

References
Deep Cuts on Strawbsweb
Sleeve notes AMLH 68331 Deep Cuts
Deep Cuts in-depth feature on Strawbsweb

Notes

Strawbs albums
1976 albums